Terra Nova is the debut extended play by American noise rock band The Austerity Program, released in 2003 through Hydra Head Records. The disc received mixed reception, some critics praised its experimental tendencies, while others critiqued repetition. The EP performed poorly commercial-wise, and it is considered as one of the least-selling records Hydra Head has ever released.

Track listing

Personnel
The Austerity Program
Thad Calabrese - Bass
Justin Foley - Guitar, Vocals
The Drum Machine - Percussion

Production
Nick Zampiello - Mastering
Abby Moskowitz - Photography
The Austerity Program - Music, Art direction
A. Tuner - Design and construction

References

2003 debut EPs
The Austerity Program albums
Hydra Head Records EPs